David Arthur Blair MBE, MC (25 August 1917 – 10 April 1985) was a Scottish amateur golfer. He finished in the top-10 in the Open Championship in 1960 and played in the Walker Cup in 1955 and 1961. He was a retired major in the Seaforth Highlanders in the British Army. His younger brother Chandos was also in the Seaforth Highlanders.

Early life
Blair was educated at Harrow School and the Royal Military College, Sandhurst.

Military career
Blair graduated from Sandhurst on 26 August 1937 and was commissioned as a second lieutenant in the Seaforth Highlanders, a line infantry regiment of the  British Army. He was captured at El Adem in 1942 but escaped in 1943. He was awarded the Military Cross when his company made an assault crossing over a canal in Holland in late 1944.

Business career
Blair was chairman of the Scotch whisky export committee from 1985 to 1980 and a director of Distillers Company. He was also chairman of United Glass Ltd.

Amateur wins
1953 Scottish Amateur
1955 Golf Illustrated Gold Vase
1956 Golf Illustrated Gold Vase

Results in major championships

Note: Blair only played in the Masters Tournament and The Open Championship.

CUT = missed the half-way cut
"T" indicates a tie for a place

Team appearances
Commonwealth Tournament (representing Great Britain): 1954
Walker Cup (representing Great Britain & Ireland): 1955, 1961
Amateurs–Professionals Match (representing the Amateurs): 1956, 1960

References

Scottish male golfers
Amateur golfers
Scottish military personnel
Members of the Order of the British Empire
British Army personnel of World War II
Seaforth Highlanders officers
Recipients of the Military Cross
British World War II prisoners of war
British escapees
Graduates of the Royal Military College, Sandhurst
People educated at Harrow School
1917 births
1985 deaths